A redneck is a white person of lower socioeconomic status in the United States and Canada.

Redneck or rednecks may also refer to:

Redneck (comics), a comic character.
"Redneck" (song), by Lamb of God.
"Rednecks" (song), by Randy Newman.
Redneck (film), a film starring Telly Savalas and Mark Lester.
Rednek, British dubstep musician.
 Rednecks, the nick name used to describe members of 88 (Arracan) Battery Royal Artillery, a unit of the British Royal Regiment of Artillery

See also
Rednex, a band

tr:Redneck (anlam ayrımı)